Abuta is a plant genus in the family Menispermaceae.

Abuta may also refer to:

Plants in the genus Cissampelos, which are sometimes referred to as abuta for their common name
Abuta District, Hokkaidō, a district of Hokkaidō, Japan
Strung disk shell money formerly used in New Guinea